Gala Galaction (the pen name of Grigore or Grigorie Pisculescu, (the quarter "Pantelimon" is presumed to preserve his memory) ; April 16, 1879—March 8, 1961) was a Romanian Orthodox clergyman and theologian, writer, journalist, left-wing activist, as well as a political figure of the People's Republic of Romania. Contrary to the spirit of the time, he was a promoter of tolerance towards the Jewish minority.

Biography

Early life
He was born in the village of Didești, Teleorman County, the son of a wealthy peasant and a priest's daughter. His father had traveled throughout the Balkans on business, and had settled down as an estate lessee.

After completing his primary studies in his native village and in Roșiorii de Vede (1888–1890), he went on to study at the Saint Sava National College in Bucharest (1890–1898), and, after a period of studying philosophy at the University of Bucharest, took a degree in Theology at Czernowitz University. During the period, Galaction began to take an interest in literature, and was briefly influenced by the ideas of Sâr Péladan, a French occultist and poet. He debuted in 1900 with the novella Moara lui Călifar ("Călifar's Mill"), a sinister story on the subject of demonic temptation; nevertheless, his growing interest in Orthodoxy led him to abandon literature for the following ten years — his 1914 volume of collected stories, comprising La Vulturi! (one of his most famous pieces of writing), was awarded the Romanian Academy prize.

Early 1900s activism
Having spent his early years a disciple of the Marxist philosopher Constantin Dobrogeanu-Gherea, he was partisan of Poporanism and, like his close friend N. D. Cocea, socialism - tendencies which established him as a leading figure on the left wing of the Romanian political spectrum. According to Vianu later assessmed, during communism rule:
"The attraction towards socialism during Galaction's youth was always confessed and never was disavowed, although the religious outlook on life, formulated through the influence of his family and his immediate environment, led him to see socialists as fellow travellers rather than comrades in battle."

Noted for his criticism of the violent repression of the Romanian Peasants' Revolt in 1907, he soon became an active journalist. With the help of Tudor Arghezi, he edited Cronica and Spicul, which appeared during World War I (between 1915 and 1918). Like his friend Arghezi and others, he displayed his sympathy for the Central Powers, and remained in Bucharest under German occupation, collaborating with the new authorities. Eventually, Galaction welcomed the new political mood established by the Russian Revolution (and first manifested in Romania by the activities of the Socialist Party and the strikes of 1918–1919):
"We were given to witness with our own eyes how the old worlds are crumbling and how the new ones are born. And it seems to me that the spectacle is at its most interesting as seen from our little Romanian island. [...] The power of the many, let loose all around us, is rising, is fretting, is roaring and is looking for a new balance. Let us not delude ourselves by thinking we could ever see it return to its previous mould. It would be absurd."

At around the same time, he became an enthusiastic advocate of the labor movement. A public meeting of factory workers left a lasting impression on him:
"Out of the smoldering and mud-covered suburbs, out of the humid and suffocating basements, out of the thousands of only too small cells, where the proletarian bee distills the honey of capitalist drones, out of all places high and low, the working people had come in black flocks in order to increase, standing shoulder to shoulder, the phalanx of socialist demands."

Soon after the war, Galaction befriended Nicolae Tonitza, a painter and illustrator of socialist newspapers who produced the cover of Galaction's collection of essays (O lume nouă) and painted his portrait under the title "The Man of a New World". In his memoir of the period, the art collector Krikor Zambaccian described the latter as: 
"that hallucinatory portrait [...]. On a background of intense blue is profiled the mage-like figure of the writer Galaction; on the most distant plane emerge the silhouettes of industries and rise up the chimneys of factories."

Interwar

In 1922, he was anointed priest, and in 1926 he became professor of Theology and New Testament Studies at the Chişinău University Theology School. He was dean of the School between 1928 and 1930.

Together with priest Vasile Radu, he worked on a new translation of the Bible into modern Romanian, a work published in 1938, meant as a newer and more accurate version to replace the traditional Cantacuzino Bible. The literary critic Tudor Vianu wrote:
"[...] the new translation, accomplished through the means created by newer literary evolution and with the talent of a modern poet, presents a major philological and artistic interest."

During the interwar period, Galaction was also the author of several studies, articles and commentaries on the New Testament, as well as completing a celebrated translation of William Shakespeare's The Merchant of Venice. He contributed regularly to Viața Românească and Adevărul, as well as to Sămănătorul, but was on exceptionally bad terms with the latter's founder, Nicolae Iorga.

In 1936, he was the subject of a denunciation for "communist activities" and alleged links with the Comintern, which he dismissed as slander. Nevertheless, in 1938–1940, Galaction, like other figures on the Poporanist and socialist Left (among them Armand Călinescu, Petre Andrei, Mihai Ralea, Ioan Flueraș, and Mihail Ghelmegeanu), was attracted into collaboration with the fascist-inspired corporatist regime created, as a means to combat the influence of the pro-Nazi Iron Guard, around King Carol II and the National Renaissance Front. Upon the outbreak of the September Campaign and World War II, he wrote:
"The war has begun. Hitler the monster or the demigod, the lever of destiny or the Devil's puppet, has again lifted the banner of death amid the borders of peoples. Is he the forerunner and the prophet of better times, or the strix of downfalls and irremediable disasters? Are the Germans fighting for a better future, or for the narthex of barbarity and for the death of Europe? This is yet another pathetic scrutiny! Christian peoples turn their backs on The Calvary, disavow the laws of their upbringing and mock the Nine Joys! The De-Christianized Germans and the Roman Catholic Poles are equally vainglorious and lacking in Christian spirit."

1940s
The fall of Carol's rule and the establishment of the Iron Guard's National Legionary State saw Galaction's retreat from public life, prolonged after the Legionnaires' Rebellion and the onset of Ion Antonescu's dictatorship. In 1944, as the August 23 coup overthrew Antonescu, taking Romania out of the Axis camp and opening the country to Soviet influence, Galaction expressed his enthusiasm:
"The long-awaited hour has arrived during a night when our hearts were being estinguished with fear and our houses were falling apart... It has arrived after traveling a long way, passing among ruins, tombs, and smoke-covered towers... It is here!... Become an epoch, become a century, you long-awaited hour!"

Soon after, Galaction began collaborating with the Romanian Communist Party and its various organizations. In 1947, he replaced the purged Nichifor Crainic as a member of the Romanian Academy, and was elected vice-president of the Writers' Union in the same year; Galaction was himself purged from the Academy later in the same year, and readmitted as an honorary member in 1948. Many times decorated, he was also elected to the Parliament of Romania (1946–1948), and to its successor, the Great National Assembly (a legislative body of little actual relevance; 1948–1952).

Final years

One of the last causes he was involved in was the peace movement (in the context of the Cold War), with the intention of helping in the creation of a "supreme areopagus of peace". He was bedridden for the final years of his life, due to a stroke; this probably accounted for the scarcity in criticism aimed at him during the Zhdanovist campaign in Romania.

His Diary was only published, selectively, two decades after his death, under the Nicolae Ceaușescu regime. The newer edition contains the censored discourse of an embittered Galaction, who had become heavily critical of Stalinism, while reviewing his own beliefs in an "Evangelical and cloud-like" socialism.

Galaction was also noted for the support he gave to Constantin Galeriu, who later became a celebrated priest and theologian. Galeriu, who had been one of Galaction's favourite students, was rescued by the latter in 1952, after he was arrested and imprisoned at the Danube-Black Sea Canal (Galaction successfully called on Prime Minister Petru Groza to intervene in his favor).

Personal life
Galaction had four daughters, one of whom, Maria or Mărioara, was married to Șerban Țuculescu, the brother of painter Ion Țuculescu in 1936; one was the actress Elena Galaction Stănciulescu and the other two, Magdalena and Lucreția, married Italian citizens — the husband of Luki Galaction (Galaction Passarelli or Galaction Sciarra), who was a painter and a writer, was Domenico Sciarra, a prominent figure of the Fascist regime (whom Gala Galaction was visiting in Rome at the time of his denunciation).

A friend of Communist politician Lucrețiu Pătrășcanu, Galaction helped his Jewish wife Herta Schwamen avoid anti-Semitic measures enforced in 1938 by the National Christian Party government, baptizing her Romanian Orthodox (she consequently took the Christian name Elena).

Galaction was a lifelong friend of the journalist Vasile Demetrius, whom he first collaborated with during the 1910s. He was also close to Vasile's daughter, the novelist and actress Lucia Demetrius, who expressed her gratitude for the moral support he gave her family after Vasile Demetrius died.

Relationship with the Jewish community 
Galaction published articles in several Romanian-Jewish periodicals, such as Mântuirea (1919–1922), Lumea Evree (1919–1920), Știri din Lumea Evreiască (1924–1925) and Adam (1929–1939).

His contributions were later collected in the volume Sionismul la Prieteni ("Zionism among Friends"), published in 1919. Alongside his praise for Theodor Herzl, whom he considered "the greatest Israelite in the modern world", he wrote: 
"Whoever reads and loves the Bible cannot hate Israel."

In 1930, he was a pilgrim to Jerusalem, visiting the British Mandate of Palestine together with his lifelong friend and brother-in-law of his daughter, the painter Ion Ţuculescu, and both their families. Reviewing his travel memoir În pământul făgăduinței ("In the Promised Land"), Alexandru A. Philippide, a fellow writer at Viața Românească, thought that Galaction's attitude was linked to both his own theological outlook on tolerance and the branch of Christianity he represented:
"[A] tolerant character is, after all, what sets Orthodoxy apart. Father Galaction turns this into his point of honor. On the same ship as him there were many Jewish immigrants, setting for Palestine. «Brave soldiers of such a passionate and sacrifice-eager ideal!» exclaims Father Galaction. That is, indeed, an exclamation that goes beyond faith (or, in any case, stems from plaits of the soul other than faith)."

In late 1947, Galaction welcomed the more decisive steps taken towards the creation of Israel. Nowadays, in remembrance of his role, a square in Jerusalem bears his name.

Selected literary works

Bisericuța din Răzoare. Nuvele și schițe ("The Small Church in Răzoare. Short Stories and Literary Sketches"), 1914
Eminescu ("The Life of Mihai Eminescu"), 1914
Clopotele din mănăstirea Neamțu ("Bells of the Neamț Monastery"), 1916
La țărmul mărei (Reverii. Note) ("On the Seashore. Reveries and Notes"), 1916
O lume nouă. Articole ("A New World. Articles"), 1919
Răboj pe bradul verde ("Tally on Green-Wooded Fir"), 1920
Toamne de odinioară ("Bygone Autumns"), 1924
De la noi la Cladova ("From Us to Cladova"), 1924
Caligraful Terțiu. Adevăr și închipuire ("Terțiu the Calligrapher. Truth and Make-belief"), 1929
Roxana. Roman ("Roxana. A Novel"), 1930
Papucii lui Mahmud. Roman ("Mahmud's Slippers. A Novel"), 1931
Doctorul Taifun. Roman ("Doctor Typhoon. A Novel"), 1933
La răspântie de veacuri. Roman ("At the Crossroads of Centuries. A Novel"), 2 vol., 1935
Rița Crăița. Fantezie dramatică în trei acte ("Rița Crăița. Fantasy Drama in Three Acts"), 1942
În grădinile Sf. Antonie ("In Saint Anthony's Gardens"), 1942
Vlahuță ("The Life of Alexandru Vlahuță"), 1944
Mangalia, 1947

Notes

References
 Gala Galaction (as "Grigorie Pişculescu") biography in the Dictionary of Romanian Theologians
 "Făcătorul de pace" ("The Maker of Peace"), in Jurnalul Național, April 5, 2004
 Gabriela Antoniu, Claudiu Târziu, "Pătrășcanu a primit un glonţ în ceafă" ("Pătrăşcanu Received a Bullet in the Back of His Neck"), in Jurnalul Național, March 8, 2004
Lucian Boia, History and Myth in Romanian Consciousness, Central European University Press, Budapest, 2001
 Sabin Cernătescu,  "Gala Galaction (1879–1961)", in Observatorul
 Florentina Dolghin, "Primele zile de război", in Magazin Istoric
Victor Frunză, Istoria stalinismului în România, Humanitas, Bucharest, 1990
 Florența Ivaniuc, Cristian-Robert Velescu, Ion Ţuculescu - participare la misterul creației ("Ion Țuculescu - Partaking in the Mystery of Creation")
Monica Matei-Chesnoiu, Shakespeare in the Romanian Cultural Memory, Fairleigh Dickinson University Press, Madison, New Jersey, 2006
Dan C. Mihăilescu, "Lecturi la tavă – Antisovieticul Galaction" - review of Galaction's diary, in Jurnalul Național, October 15, 2006
Alexandru A. Philippide, "Recenzii. Gala Galaction" ("Reviews. Gala Galaction"), in Viața Românească, 4-5/XXII (April–May 1930)
Petru Popescu Gogan, "Memento!", in Memoria Stelian Tănase,  "«Pe tatăl meu denunțul nu l-a afectat cu nimic, era întotdeauna bine dispus»" ("«My Father Was Not in the Least Harmed by the Denunciation. He Was Always in a Cheerful Mood»"), interview with Elena Galaction, the daughter of Gala Galaction, in Observator CulturalFrancisco Veiga, Istoria Gărzii de Fier, 1919–1941: Mistica ultranaționalismului, Humanitas, Bucharest, 1993
Tudor Vianu, Scriitori români, Vol. III, Ed. Minerva, Bucharest, 1971
Henri Zalis, introduction to Lucia Demetrius, Album de familie. Nuvele alese (1935–1965) ("Family Album. Collected Short Stories (1935–1965)"), Editura pentru literatură, Bucharest, 1967, p.V-XXXI
 Krikor Zambaccian, "Chapter XII: Tonitza", in Însemnările unui amator de artă'' ("The Recordings of an Art Aficionado"), published and hosted by LiterNet

External links
 Gala Galaction's biography at Compendium
 Gala Galaction Memorial House

Romanian Orthodox priests
Romanian theologians
Poporanists
20th-century Eastern Orthodox theologians
Translators of the Bible into Romanian
Translators of William Shakespeare
Romanian activists
Romanian biographers
Romanian male novelists
Male biographers
Romanian Christian pacifists
Romanian Christian socialists
Romanian dramatists and playwrights
Romanian essayists
Romanian magazine editors
Romanian magazine founders
20th-century Romanian novelists
Romanian philosophers
Romanian male short story writers
Romanian short story writers
Romanian translators
Romanian travel writers
Recipients of the Order of the Star of the Romanian Socialist Republic
Adevărul writers
Titular members of the Romanian Academy
Members of the Great National Assembly
Members of the Chamber of Deputies (Romania)
Saint Sava National College alumni
Censorship in Romania
Jewish Romanian history
People from Teleorman County
1879 births
1961 deaths
20th-century biographers
20th-century Eastern Orthodox priests
Eastern Orthodox socialists
Christian socialist theologians
University of Bucharest alumni
Eastern Orthodox biblical scholars
20th-century Christian biblical scholars
European biblical scholars
Romanian biblical scholars
Academic staff of Moldova State University
Burials at Cernica Monastery Cemetery